Pagamea is a genus of flowering plants in the family Rubiaceae, native to northern South America. Shrubs or small trees, they are specialists in the Amazonian white-sand forests.

Species
Currently accepted species include:

Pagamea acrensis Steyerm.
Pagamea anisophylla Standl. & Steyerm.
Pagamea aracaensis B.M.Boom
Pagamea capitata Benth.
Pagamea coriacea Spruce ex Benth.
Pagamea diceras Steyerm.
Pagamea duckei Standl.
Pagamea dudleyi Steyerm.
Pagamea duidana Standl. & Steyerm.
Pagamea guianensis Aubl.
Pagamea harleyi Steyerm.
Pagamea hirsuta Spruce ex Benth.
Pagamea jauaensis Steyerm.
Pagamea macrophylla Spruce ex Benth.
Pagamea magniflora Steyerm.
Pagamea montana Gleason & Standl.
Pagamea pauciflora Standl. & Steyerm.
Pagamea pilosa (Standl.) Steyerm.
Pagamea plicata Spruce ex Benth.
Pagamea plicatiformis Steyerm.
Pagamea puberula Steyerm.
Pagamea sessiliflora Spruce ex Benth.
Pagamea spruceana Vicent. & E.M.B.Prata
Pagamea standleyana Steyerm.
Pagamea thyrsiflora Spruce ex Benth.
Pagamea velutina Steyerm.

References

Gaertnereae
Rubiaceae genera